A Stabsführer (translated as Staff Leader) served as a deputy to the leader of Hitler Youth, National Socialist Flyers Corps, National Socialist Motor Corps or Sturmabteilung. It was furthermore a Hitler Youth paramilitary rank held by the senior most member of the Adult Leadership Corps.

The SS-Oberabschnitt (major districts) and SS-Abschnitt (sub districts) of the Allgemeine SS each had their own Stabsführer to head certain staff of the district. In the SS-Abschnitt they were often the de facto leader.

Office holders

Hitler Youth

NSFK

NSKK

SA

References

See also
Stabschef

Nazi paramilitary ranks